Judio is an unincorporated community in Cumberland County, Kentucky, United States.  It lies along Route 953 southwest of the city of Burkesville, the county seat of Cumberland County.  Its elevation is 545 feet (166 m).

References

Unincorporated communities in Cumberland County, Kentucky
Unincorporated communities in Kentucky